Lumír Kiesewetter (27 September 1919 – 14 April 1973) was a Czech athlete. He competed in the men's javelin throw at the 1948 Summer Olympics.

References

External links
 

1919 births
1973 deaths
Athletes (track and field) at the 1948 Summer Olympics
Czech male javelin throwers
Olympic athletes of Czechoslovakia
People from Litomyšl
Sportspeople from the Pardubice Region